Mallard is a surname. Notable people with the surname include:

Andrew Mallard (1962–2019), wrongfully convicted of murder in Perth, Western Australia
Chante Jawan Mallard (born 1976), African American woman from Texas who was convicted of the murder of Gregory Glenn Biggs and sentenced to 50 years' imprisonment
Ernest-François Mallard (1833–1894), French mineralogist
Felix Mallard (born 1998), Australian actor
Henri Mallard (1884–1967), Australian photographer of the construction of Sydney Harbour Bridge
John Mallard (1927–2021), Professor of Medical Physics at the University of Aberdeen
Josh Mallard (born 1980), American football defensive end
Rob Mallard (born 1992), English actor
Sax Mallard (1915–1986), American jazz saxophonist
Shayne Mallard (born 1964), political figure in the inner Sydney area
Trevor Mallard (born 1954), New Zealand politician
Wesly Mallard (born 1978), American football linebacker